Diane Pedgrift (born 10 May 1988) is a Scottish woman cricketer. She was a member of the Scottish cricket team at the 2008 Women's Cricket World Cup Qualifier. She is also a member of the Arbroath United Cricket Club.

References

External links 
 
 Profile at CricHQ

1988 births
Living people
Scottish women cricketers
Scottish accountants